Miss Earth Vietnam (Vietnamese: Hoa hậu Trái Đất Việt Nam) was first held in 2022 (as Miss Ethnic Vietnam - Hoa hậu các dân tộc Việt Nam) to look for Vietnamese representatives at the Miss Earth competition.

The current Miss Earth Vietnam 2022 is Thạch Thu Thảo. She represented Vietnam in Miss Earth 2022 and finished as one of the top 20 semi-finalists.

Representation
This is the representative list of Vietnam at Miss Earth. Vietnam began sending representatives in 2003. The years 2008–2009, 2013-2015 had no representatives. In 2018, Vietnam won Miss Earth for the first time.

History
In 2003, Vietnam debuted at Miss Earth represented by Nguyễn Ngân Hà.

In 2009, Bùi Thúy Hạnh represented Vietnam at Miss Earth 2004 was invited to judge Miss Earth 2009.

In 2010, Miss Earth was held in Vietnam, the representative of Vietnam was Lưu Thị Diễm Hương.

After 3 years there is no representation. In 2016, Vietnam returned and represented by Nguyễn Thị Lệ Nam Em.

In 2018, Leading Media held a casting representative of Vietnam at international competitions called Leading Stars Project. Ms Lorraine Schuck the Miss Earth president, Angelia Ong Miss Earth 2015, Michelle Gómez Miss Earth-Air 2016, ... has been invited to be the international judge. Nguyễn Phương Khánh has won the title of Miss Earth Vietnam 2018. At Miss Earth 2018, she won and brought the first Miss Earth crown to Vietnam.

From 2022, the copyright of Miss Earth in Vietnam will be held by Nova Entertainment.

Titleholders

Vietnam's representatives at Miss Earth
Color keys

See also
 Miss Vietnam
 Miss Universe Vietnam
 Miss World Vietnam
 Miss Grand Vietnam
 Miss Supranational Vietnam
 Miss Vietnamese World
 Mister Vietnam

References

Vietnam
Beauty pageants in Vietnam